Bragernes Church (Bragernes Kirke) is a parish church at Drammen in Viken county, Norway.

It was designed by Ernst Norgrenn (1839-1880) in Neo Gothic style and built of brick. It was consecrated in 1871. The old Bragernes church (Gamle Bragernes kirke) was west of Bragernes square. Built in 1708, it burned down in 1866.

Bragernes church is located at the end of Church Street north of Bragernes square in the center of Drammen. Bragernes Cemetery is west of the church. The pulpit was designed by Ernst Norgrenn, while the baptismal font was by Christian Borch. The altarpiece, Resurrection was painted by Adolph Tidemand. It was copied in many Norwegian churches. The church organ has 38 voices and was built in the romantic style of organ builder Carsten Lund Organ Builders of Copenhagen (Carsten Lund Orgelbyggeri).

References

External links

Bragernes Kirke website
Bragernes Church on YouTube

Buildings and structures in Drammen
Churches in Viken
Churches completed in 1871
Event venues established in 1871
1871 establishments in Norway
19th-century Church of Norway church buildings